Andrew Piazza is an American former basketball player and coach. He was one of the first influx of foreign professional players in Iceland during the 1970s and in 1978 he led Knattspyrnufélag Reykjavíkur to the Icelandic championship. He was the head coach of Indiana University – Purdue University Fort Wayne men's basketball team from 1987 to 1996, amassing 144 wins.

Early life
Piazza was born in Michigan and attended Central Michigan University.

Playing career
In 1977, Piazza signed with Icelandic powerhouse KR as a player-coach. On 20 October 1977, he scored 28 points in KR's largest ever victory against arch-rivals ÍR in the pre-season Reykjavík Basketball Tournament. On 22 October he scored 50 points against ÍS in the last game of the tournament, helping KR clinching the tournament title for the second year in a row. He led all scorers during the tournament with 142 points in 5 games for an average 28.4 points per game.

On 29 March 1978, he led KR to the national championship after scoring 20 points in the championship clinching game. Piazza caused a minor controversy during the championship celebrations when he cut down the net from one of the baskets, a well known custom in the United States but unheard of in Iceland, with Laugardalshöll officials threatening to bar the forthcoming Icelandic Cup finals game to take place on the court if KR would not reimburse them for the destroyed net. He finished 5th in the league in scoring during the season, with 325 points in 14 games for an average of 23.2 points per game.

Later career
After retiring from playing, Piazza coached at Delta College and Indiana University – Purdue University Fort Wayne. He was inducted into the IPFW Athletics Hall of Fame in 2007.

References

American expatriate basketball people in Iceland
American men's basketball coaches
American men's basketball players
Basketball coaches from Michigan
Basketball players from Michigan
Central Michigan University alumni
High school basketball coaches in Michigan
Junior college men's basketball coaches in the United States
KR men's basketball coaches
KR men's basketball players
Purdue Fort Wayne Mastodons men's basketball coaches
Úrvalsdeild karla (basketball) players
1950s births
Living people